Daydreaming is the debut album by Rafael Anton Irisarri, released by Norwegian label Miasmah. It was originally released worldwide as physical and digital album on February 28, 2007. The physical copies quickly became out of print. The album was very well received by the press and music community.

Track listing

All tracks written, arranged, and produced by Rafael Anton Irisarri

"Waking Expectations"
"A Thousand-Yard Stare"
"Wither"
"Lumberton"
"Voigt-Kampf"
"Fractal"
"A Glimpse"
"She Dreams Alone" (Vinyl-only bonus track)

Personnel
Rafael Anton Irisarri — Production, mixing; synthesizer, piano, acoustic, electronic and non-conventional instruments
 Daniel C. Wictorson - Piano on Lumberton
 Nan Schwarz - Cello on She Dreams Alone
Andreas Tilliander — Mastering
Tomas Boden — Speldosa on A Glimpse, Liner Notes
Erik K. Skodvin — Artwork design

References

2007 debut albums
Rafael Anton Irisarri albums